Flying Again is the fourth studio album by the country rock group The Flying Burrito Brothers, released in 1975.

After Gram Parsons' death in 1973, posthumous interest in the Burrito Brothers' music grew.  This interest caused the band's original label, A&M Records, to release the compilation album Close Up the Honky-Tonks in 1974. Since Rick Roberts had dissolved the Flying Burrito Brothers after a brief 1973 European tour with no original members, former manager Eddie Tickner started to think about the possibilities of reviving the band.

After Tickner received booking interest from a number of clubs, founding members "Sneaky" Pete Kleinow and Chris Ethridge agreed to re-form the Burritos. They hired former Byrds drummer Gene Parsons, guitarist Joel Scott Hill from Canned Heat, and fiddler Gib Guilbeau to round out the "refried" Burritos. Tickner then got the new band a deal with Columbia Records, of which Flying Again was their label debut.

Despite having two original members, the sound of this album is markedly different from the albums released by the original incarnation. The best examples of this are on the tracks "Dim Lights, Thick Smoke (And Loud, Loud Music)" and "Hot Burrito #3". "Dim Lights" is much faster and more rocking than the version recorded by the original lineup that would appear in 1976.  While bassist Chris Ethridge had a significant hand in the writing of "Hot Burrito #1" and #2,  #3 is a jarring departure from the style of the first two songs. The lyrics are written more as a caricature of the first two. 
Joel Scott Hill handled lead vocals on most of the tracks, with Gib Guilbeau on three (Including a sprightly version of "Why Baby Why") and Gene Parsons on one.  "Building Fires" was released as a single.

Track listing
 "Easy to Get On" (Bob Brown, Joel Scott Hill) – 3:18
 "Wind and Rain" (Gene Parsons, Gib Guilbeau) – 4:28
 "Why Baby Why" (George Jones, Darrell Edwards) – 2:24
 "Dim Lights, Thick Smoke (And Loud, Loud Music)" (Max Fidler, Joe Maphis, Rose Lee Maphis) – 2:16
 "You Left the Water Running" (Dan Penn, Oscar Frank, Rick Hall) – 2:23
 "Building Fires" (Dan Penn, Johnny Christopher, Jim Dickinson) – 4:18
 "Sweet Desert Childhood" (Gene Parsons) – 3:44
 "Bon Soir Blues" (Gib Guilbeau, Thad Maxwell) – 4:11
 "River Road" (Gib Guilbeau) – 2:59
 "Hot Burrito #3" (Chris Ethridge, Gib Guilbeau, Joel Scott Hill, Pete Kleinow, Gene Parsons) – 2:07

Personnel
The Flying Burrito Brothers
 "Sneaky" Pete Kleinow - pedal steel guitar
 Chris Ethridge - bass
 Joel Scott Hill - vocals, guitar
 Gib Guilbeau - vocals, fiddle, guitar
 Gene Parsons - vocals, drums, guitar, harmonica
with:
Spooner Oldham - piano, organ

References 

The Flying Burrito Brothers albums
1975 albums
Albums produced by Norbert Putnam
Columbia Records albums